Liocranum is a genus of spiders in the family Liocranidae. The genus was first described by Ludwig Carl Christian Koch in 1866.

Species
According to The World Spider Catalog, Version 12.5:
 Liocranum apertum Denis, 1960 — France
 Liocranum concolor Simon, 1878 — Corsica
 Liocranum erythrinum Pavesi, 1883 — Ethiopia
 Liocranum freibergi Charitonov, 1946 — Uzbekistan
 Liocranum giersbergi Kraus, 1955 — Sardinia
 Liocranum kochi Herman, 1879 — Hungary
 Liocranum majus Simon, 1878 — Spain
 Liocranum nigritarse L. Koch, 1875 — Ethiopia
 Liocranum ochraceum L. Koch, 1867 — Corfu
 Liocranum perarmatum Kulczyński, 1897 — Slovenia, Croatia
 Liocranum pulchrum Thorell, 1881 — New Guinea
 Liocranum remotum Bryant, 1940 — Cuba
 Liocranum rupicola Walckenaer, 1830 — Europe, Russia
 Liocranum segmentatum Simon, 1878 — France
 Liocranum variabilis Wunderlich, 2008 — Mallorca

References

Corinnidae
Araneomorphae genera
Spiders of Africa
Spiders of Asia
Spiders of Oceania